Robert Henson (born January 27, 1986) is a former American football linebacker. He was drafted by the Washington Redskins in the sixth round of the 2009 NFL Draft. He played college football at TCU.

Early years
Henson earned District 11-5A Defensive Player of the Year honors as a senior in 2003 at Longview High School in Longview, Texas.  He chose to attend TCU over offers from Arkansas and Nebraska.

College career
Henson began his college career at Texas Christian University as a redshirt freshman in 2005, when he started two games and played in all twelve as a redshirt freshman for the MWC Champion Horned Frogs.  In his freshman, sophomore and junior seasons, Henson was at least third on the team in tackles, was named Honorable Mention All-MWC, and the Frogs won their bowl game.  In his senior year, he was named 1st Team All-MWC  and recorded 73 tackles, one sack and two interceptions.

Professional career
Henson was drafted by the Washington Redskins in the sixth round of the 2009 NFL Draft, to compete for a middle linebacker position and contributing to special teams.

On September 21, 2009, following an "unsightly" 9-7 home victory, Henson posted some disparaging remarks via his Twitter account about fans who had booed and jeered the Redskins' performance. Specifically he called the fans who jeered the team "dim wits", said that the same people would trade places with him in a second due to the money he was making, and that he did not appreciate being booed in his own home stadium. Henson went further by saying the fans did not understand what was best for the team because they "work 9 to 5 at McDonald's", which drew the most criticism.   After much criticism from the media and fans, Henson apologized and has since deactivated his account. He was placed on injured reserve on September 4, 2010.

On August 5, 2011, he waived by the Redskins.

References

External links
TCU Horned Frogs bio
Washington Redskins bio

1986 births
Living people
People from Longview, Texas
Longview High School alumni
Texas Christian University alumni
Players of American football from Texas
American football linebackers
TCU Horned Frogs football players
Washington Redskins players